Cupello is a comune and town in the province of Chieti in the Abruzzo region of Italy

Twin towns
 Ladispoli, Italy
 Benicarló, Spain

References

Cities and towns in Abruzzo